Sholinghur is a municipality under Sholinghur taluk in Ranipet District of Tamil Nadu, India. The town is  famous in Tamil Nadu and other neighboring states for the Lakshmi Narasimha Swamy temple. 

Sholinghur is located between Tiruttani (Tamil Nadu) and Chittoor (Andhra Pradesh). This town connects major towns and cities like Arakkonam, Vellore (Tamil Nadu), and Bengaluru (Karnataka).
This municipality has 27 wards. In local body elections 2022,DMK won majority by winning 19 wards.

Etymology
The first name for this  town was Thirukkadigai. This signifies its status as one of the 108 Divya Desams in Vaishnavism. The reason behind the name Thirukkadigai is due to one of the following beliefs.
 It is believed by historians that sage Vishwamitra attained title by worshiping Narasimha there for around 45 minutes.
 It is said in sculptures that saptha rishis had vision and blessings from Lord Narasimha for a duration of time, termed as 'Kadigai' (approximately 45 minutes) and hence the name 'Thirukkadigai'.
 It is also believed that Indra, with his demigods, would take a bath in the pushkarni and pray to Narasimha. The name of pushkarni is 'Thakkan'.
 The Pushkarni is believed by historians to have medicated water which cures all diseases.
 Budha (son of Chandra) worshipped the deity there and was cured from the curse given by sage Durvasa.
 Many mental disorders, evil acts and prolonged diseases of any kinds are believed to be cured when people take bath in the pushkarni and pay obeisance to the lords on the two hillocks.

During the days of Cholas & Nawabs, the name Thirukkadigai was less used and the name Chozha Singapuram acquired prominence.

Reference is made to a ghatika in the Tiruvallam inscription of Nandivarman Pallavamalla dated in his 61st year.  Again an arbitrator having the title Trairjyua ghatika madhyasthan is mentioned in three inscriptions of Parthivendradhipathi from Brahmadesam in North Arcot District (Kanchipuram district) of Tamil Nadu  This ghatika was presumably a different one from the famous one at the Pallava capital Kanchipuram.  It was probably the Ghatikachala at the Sholinghur hill.  This place is referred to as Kadigai in the siriya thirumadal and periya thirumoli of Vaishnava saint Tirumangai Alvar, a contemporary of Nandivaraman Pallavamalla.  During the Pallava period it was a well-known centre of Sanskrit learning and stronghold of Vaisnavism.  The early Vaisnava saint Peyalvar refers to this temple as Pungatikai in his Iyarpa third Andadi. Pallava influences are traceable in the neighbourhood of this place.  A cave temple belonging to Mahendravarma I who reigned early in the seventh century is from Kanchipuram bearing the name Mahendravisnugrha is found in Mahendravadi.  It is not unlikely that a ghatika was founded there by the successors of Mahendravarman and the place was named Ghatikachalam.  In his hymns on the Tirukkannapuram on the hill of Ghatikai. The ghatika is Sholinghur hill consisted of Vaisnava Brahmans who carried on a programme of higher studies specially drawn up for the institution.  The institution presumably attracted its students from several places around Ghatikachalam. The ghatika was probably located the hill temple itself dedicated to Narasimha.  Sholinghur which a Kadigai was seat of Great learning in the later Pallava age continued to be an educational centre in subsequent days during the chola age.  Even to this day there is a Sanskrit College at this place.

The current name of the town is a contraction of the words Chola-linga-puram, and was given to because a Chola king had found a natural lingam (suyambu) here, and built a temple over it, called the Sholeswara temple.  The temple is located in the middle of the town.

According to legends, Lord Narasimha would not only take several reincarnations in this world to reform people, but also send his messengers as preceptors to perform this function. One such preceptor was Doddacharya of Chozha Lingapuram (சோழலிங்கபுறம்), who lived nearly 470 years ago, performing service to Lord Yoga Narasimhar.

Doddacharya used to visit Kanchipuram Varadharaja Perumal temple every year during Bhramotsavam. On one particular year, he fell sick and was not able to visit the Kanchipuram Temple. Sitting on the banks of present-day Thakkan kulam (Pushkarini) he prayed to God Varadharaja Perumal. Heeding to his prayers, God Varadharaja Perumal appeared in front of him for few seconds. At the same time, the Varadharaja Perumal idol disappeared in Kanchipuram. As a result of this incident, a temple dedicated to Varadharaja Perumal Temple was built on the banks of Thakkan kulam, next to Anjaneyer Temple in Sholinghur. This Varadharaja Perumal Temple at Sholinghur is open only during the Bhramotsavam Festival days in Kanchipuram. Even today during Bhramotsavam at Kanchipuram, the Varadharaja Perumal idol will be closed with a screen for few seconds and then opened to mark the disappearance of the idol and its appearance before Doddacharya at Sholinghur some 470 years ago.

The name Choza Lingapuram was later shortened to Sholinghapuram in common usage. During the late 20th Century, the name of the town was further shortened to Sholingur, which is currently the official name of the town.

History

The town was the site of a battle during the Anglo-Mysore Wars.  It was here that Sir Eyre Coote fought against Tipu Sultan and Hyder Ali in the Second Anglo-Mysore War during the battle of sholinghur 1781. Near Sholinghur Bus Terminus, we can see the burial ground dedicated to the soldiers of Tipu Sultan army fought in the war known as Kanja Shaib Tomb. The TVS group set up its first factory in the early 1980s and has since grown to be among the largest private employer in the region.

Demographics

As per the Population Census 2011, there are total 7,359 families residing in the Sholingur city. The total population of Sholingur is 34,854 out of which 17,415 are males and 17,439 are females thus the Average Sex Ratio of Sholingur is 1,002.

The population of Children of age 0–6 years in Sholingur city is 3297 which is 11% of the total population. There are 1717 male children and 1580 female children between the age 0–6 years. Thus as per the Census 2011 the Child Sex Ratio of Sholingur is 920 which is less than Average Sex Ratio (1,002).

As per the Census 2011, the literacy rate of Sholingur is 85.6%. Thus Sholingur has higher literacy rate compared to 79.2% of Vellore district. The male literacy rate is 92.14% and the female literacy rate is 79.16% in Sholingur.

Industry

Production Industry
The residents of Sholinghur predominantly engage in agriculture and Lungi Textile weaving industry.

The town also boasts of a few TVS factories close by, supplying parts and components to automotive industries in India and abroad.
 Brakes India Limited (Foundry Division)
 Brakes India Limited (Brakes Division)
 Light Alloy Products Limited
 Turbo Energy Limited (Brakes Division)

Educational Institutions

Colleges
C.M.Annamalai Polytechnic
Kalaibarathi Teacher Training Institute
Matrix training centre
Meera Teacher Training Institute
Sri BharathiVelu College of Arts & Science
Saraswathi Velu College of Engineering
Sivaranjani Teacher Training Institute
Ranippettai Engineering College
Government Arts College

Schools
Vidya Peetam Senior Secondary School
Aswini Matriculation School
Ayyan Vidhyashram Matriculation School
Csi Central Primary School
Goodlet Higher Secondary School
Govt.Boys Hr. Sec School
Govt. Girls Hr. Sec School
Hayagreevar Primary School
Madhava Manthiram Primary School
Mary Mclein Middle School
Saraswathi Matriculation Hr. Sec School
Sengunthar High School
SKV International public School
Sri Divya Chaitanya Matriculation Higher Secondary School
Unity Matriculation School
Valliyammai Matriculation High School
VCS HI-TECH International School
Vedhathiri Maharishi Matric Hr. Sec. School

Financial institutions
 Bank of India
 Indian Bank
 Indian Overseas Bank
 Karur Vysya Bank
 Sholinghur Urban Bank
 Pandiyanallore Co-operative Bank
 State Bank of India
 Vellore Co-operative Bank
 Andhra Bank
 City Union Bank
 ICICI Bank

Hospitals
Sundaram Health Centre - Multi Speciality Hospital, Kondapalayam
Best Hospital
Bharathi Venkatesh Hospital
Government Hospital, Sholinghur
Kalpana Hospital
Aayurdhaa Hospital, Sholinghur (formerly Ravibharathi Hospital)
Sundaram Foundation Hospital
SVS homeocare clinic, Sholinghur

Connectivity
Sholinghur has a railway station (which is about 13 km away from Sholinghur at Banavaram). Sholinghur also has a government hospital that was awarded Tamil Nadu's Best Maintenance Award for the year 2006–07.

Government and private bus operators ply buses to Vellore, Tiruttani and Arakkonam every 15 minutes. There are also regular direct bus services available to Chennai, Vellore,  Bengaluru,  Kancheepuram, Chengalpattu,  Tambaram,  Tirupati, and Chittoor from the bus station.

Nearby towns/cities
 Ammavarikuppam - Tamilnadu (8 km)
 Ponnai - Tamil Nadu (18 km)
Banavaram - Tamil Nadu (14 km)
 Pothatturpettai - Tamil Nadu (24 km)
 Guruvarajapet - Tamil Nadu (21 km)
 Ranipet - Tamil Nadu (25 km)
 Walajapet - Tamil Nadu (25 km)
 Tiruttani - Tamil Nadu (27 km)
 Pallipattu - Tamil Nadu (27 km)
 Arakkonam - Tamil Nadu (29 km)
 Arcot - Tamil Nadu (29 km)
 Kaveripakkam - Tamil Nadu (29 km)
 Melvisharam-Tamil Nadu(35 km)
 Vellore - Tamil Nadu (50 km)
 Arni - Tamil Nadu (56 km)
 Kancheepuram - Tamil Nadu (60 km)
 Tiruvallur - Tamil Nadu (64 km)
 Pallikonda-Tamil Nadu (70 km)
 Gudiyatham-Tamil Nadu(80 km)
 Chennai - Tamil Nadu (90 km Via Rail) (Bus 128 km)
Tiruvannamalai (95 km)
 Chittoor - Andhra Pradesh (40 km)
 Nagari - Andhra Pradesh (42 km)
 Renigunta - Andhra Pradesh (73 km)
 Tirupathi - Andhra Pradesh (80 km)
RK Pet - Tamil Nadu (7.2)
Kanipakam - Andhra Pradesh (54 km)
 Bengaluru - Karnataka (211 km)

Administrations and Politics

The Sholinghur is a Municipality and legislative powers are vested in a body of 27 members, one each from the 27 wards. The legislative body is headed by an elected Chairperson assisted by a Deputy Chairperson.

Sholinghur (State Assembly Constituency) is part of Arakkonam (Lok Sabha constituency).

Current M.L.A is Mr A.M.Muniratinam Mudhaliyar from Congress and M.P is S. Jagathrakshakan from DMK.

See also
 Thirukkadigai
 Hanuman
 Narasimha
 Divya Desams

References

External links
 Sholinghur temple website
 Songs about the Sthala and its presiding deity Lord Narasimha 

Cities and towns in Ranipet district